Rachid Mohamed Rachid or Rasheed Mohamed Rasheed became Egypt's minister of foreign trade and industry in July 2004. Two years later, the ministry was expanded to include domestic trade within Egypt and was renamed the Ministry of Trade and Industry (MTI). He has been described as the first businessman ever to hold a cabinet position in Egypt and as a reformer. On 1 February 2011, during the 2011 Egyptian revolution, Rachid traveled to Dubai. Following the downfall of the Mubarak regime, Rachid was tried in absentia.

Education 

Rachid received his BSc in Mechanical Engineering from the Faculty of Engineering at Alexandria University in 1978. He has attended a number of management programs in the United States, including the Management Development Program at Stanford University in 1983, the Strategic Management Program at the MIT Sloan School of Management in 1993, and the six-week Advanced Management Program at Harvard Business School in 1996.

Career 

Prior to joining government, Rachid had an entrepreneurial and multinational career. He established and grew Fine Foods to become Egypt's leading foods brand. In 1991, a joint venture was formed with Unilever establishing Unilever Mashreq. He was later appointed as President of Unilever's Middle East, North Africa and Turkey businesses based out of London.

As minister, Rachid was a member of the government's new 'economic team' tasked with delivering a program of reforms to open Egypt up to international trade and investment. As Minister of Trade and Industry, his mandate included liberalizing Egypt's industrial sectors, attracting foreign direct investment into industry, and creating jobs. He is responsible for Egypt's foreign trade portfolio, managing Egypt's network of preferential trade agreements (with United States, Europe, Africa and the Middle East) and growing Egyptian exports. Rachid also oversees Egypt's internal trade market and is responsible for the creation of Egypt's first Competition and Consumer Protection Authorities.

As minister, Rachid pioneered a new form of public-private partnership in Egypt by involving members of the private sector in the government policy formulation process. Rachid also worked to harmonize Egypt's industrial policies with its international commitments and thus enable Egyptian industrialists and traders to benefit from Egypt's existing trade agreements.

During his time as minister, the following trade agreements were signed:
The Qualifying Industrial Zones Protocol (QIZs), which allows Egyptian-made products quota- and duty-free access to the US market provided they contain 10.5 percent Israeli content.
The Egypt-Turkey Free Trade Agreement, which allows products made in Egypt and Turkey duty-free access to the respective markets.
The Egypt-EFTA (the European Free Trade Area) Free Trade Agreement, which gives products manufactured in Egypt and the EFTA-member countries, which include Switzerland, Norway, Lichtenstein and Iceland, privileged access to other members' markets.

The Egyptian cabinet was dismissed at the end of January 2011, after widespread public protests against the government, and then Rachid no longer held a ministerial position.
Shortly afterward, Egyptian prosecutors froze his assets and prevented him from traveling, though he had already left the country by this time. Rachid was tried in absentia on charges of embezzlement and squandering public funds. Weeks later he was sentenced to an additional 15 years in prison on corruption charges and fined an additional .

In 2016 Rachid reached a deal with Egypt's Asset Recovery Committee after he was able to prove his finances and investments existed prior to his appointment to the Ministry in 2004. He returned to Egypt in 2017.

References 

Alexandria University alumni
Egyptian engineers
Faculty of Engineering, Alexandria University alumni
Egyptian businesspeople
Egyptian exiles
Fugitives wanted by Egypt
Fugitives wanted on fraud charges
Trade and Industry ministers of Egypt
Living people
MIT Sloan School of Management alumni
People of the Egyptian revolution of 2011
Politicians convicted of embezzlement
Stanford University alumni
Year of birth missing (living people)
Egyptian politicians convicted of corruption